is a Japanese manga series written and illustrated by Tsutomu Nihei. It was serialized by Kodansha in their seinen manga magazine Monthly Afternoon between April 2009 and September 2015, with its chapters collected in 15 tankōbon volumes. It tells the story of Nagate Tanikaze, an "under-dweller" destined to become a Garde pilot, whose mission is to defend the massive starship Sidonia from a hostile alien species called Gauna.

The manga was licensed for English release in North America by Vertical. An anime television series adaptation was produced by Polygon Pictures. The first season aired from April to June 2014; the second between April and June 2015. An anime film sequel titled Knights of Sidonia: Love Woven in the Stars premiered in June 2021.

In 2015, Knights of Sidonia received the 39th Kodansha Manga Award in the general category, as well as the 47th Seiun Award in the Best Comic category in 2016.

Plot

Setting
One such ship is the Sidonia, which has developed its own human culture closely based on that of Japan where human cloning, asexual reproduction, and human genetic engineering, such as granting humans photosynthesis, are commonplace. It is also revealed that the top echelons of this society have secretly been granted immortality. With a population of over 500,000 people, Sidonia is possibly the last human settlement remaining, as the fates of the other ships are unknown.

Little is known about the true nature of the Gauna or their motivation for attacking humanity. Once the ena is shed away and the core is destroyed, the Gauna's body disintegrates.

The tip of the kabizashi is made of a rare and little-understood material which has the unique property of being able to destroy a Gauna's core. Later the Gardes are also equipped with firearms whose ammunition have the same material of the Kabizashi after a means to artificially mass-produce it is discovered. Most people in the surviving human population are screened and drafted as Garde pilots at a young age, if they are shown to be capable of piloting them.

Story

The story follows the adventures of Garde pilot Nagate Tanikaze, who lived in the underground layer of Sidonia since birth and was raised by his grandfather. Never having met anyone else, he trains himself in an old Guardian pilot simulator every day, eventually mastering it. After his grandfather's death, he emerges to the surface and is selected as a Garde pilot, just as Sidonia is once again threatened by the Gauna.

Media

Manga

Knights of Sidonia, written and illustrated by Tsutomu Nihei, was serialized in Kodansha's seinen manga magazine Monthly Afternoon from April 25, 2009, to September 25, 2015. It was compiled into fifteen tankōbon volumes. The manga has been licensed in North America by Vertical, who released all fifteen volumes in English between February 5, 2013, and April 26, 2016.

Anime

An anime television series adaptation, produced by Polygon Pictures, premiered on April 10, 2014, and ended its first season on June 26, 2014, on MBS and later on TBS, CBC and BS-TBS. The series was directed by Kōbun Shizuno, assisted by Hiroyuki Seshita, with scripts by Sadayuki Murai and character designs by Yuki Moriyama. The series has also been localized and streamed by Netflix in all of its territories since July 4, 2014, becoming the service's first original anime, as well as the first anime series on Netflix available in Dolby Vision/HDR. The first season has been licensed for home video release by Sentai Filmworks. The second season was released on Netflix on July 3, 2015, and has been licensed by Sentai Filmworks for home video distribution. On June 16, 2017, a third season for the series was confirmed to be in development by director Hiroyuki Seshita. In July 2021, Funimation announced they acquired the streaming rights from Netflix to both seasons.

Films
A compilation film of the first season with additional scenes and re-edited sound effects was released on March 6, 2015.

A new anime film, titled Knights of Sidonia: Love Woven in the Stars, was announced on July 3, 2020. Hiroyuki Seshita served as chief director, while Tadahiro Yoshihira served as director for the new film, with Polygon Pictures returning for production. Sadayuki Murai and Tetsuya Yamada returned to write scripts, while Shūji Katayama composed the music. The rest of the staff and cast returned to reprise their roles. The first four minutes of the film were shown on YouTube on April 28, 2021. The film was set to premiere on May 14, 2021, but was delayed to June 4, 2021, due to the COVID-19 pandemic. Funimation screened the film in international theaters starting on September 13, 2021.

Reception

Manga
Knights of Sidonia won the 39th Kodansha Manga Award in the general category in 2015. The manga won the 47th Seiun Award in the Best Comic category in 2016. It also won the Best Seinen category at the 26th Salón del Manga de Barcelona in 2020. It was one of the Jury Recommended works in the Manga Division at the 17th Japan Media Arts Festival in 2013. The Young Adult Library Services Association listed Knights of Sidonia in its 2014 list of Top 10 Graphic Novels for Teens.

Carlo Santos from Anime News Network gave the first manga volume a B, stating, "It is got a young man piloting a giant robot against alien enemies, but Knight of Sidonia is no Neon Genesis Evangelion. Yet it is not as bleak or incomprehensible as Tsutomu Nihei works like Blame! or Biomega, either—rather, it is the best of both worlds, bringing Nihei's hard sci-fi mentality into a more conventional space-adventure environment".

Anime
The anime series received positive reviews, even from famous members of the Japanese anime/game industry, like Hideo Kojima, creator of the Metal Gear series, who claims that "It's a kind of anime that we haven't seen for a while that has that sci-fi spirit. Using digital technology cultivated through games, it creates animation that encapsulates Japan's cultural assets like manga, cel animation, kanji, giant robots, etc. What's born is a unique made-in-Japan work that could never be cooked up in Hollywood. Japanese culture has lost its 'cool', and Knights of Sidonia will be the white knight that saves it". Other industry pros left acknowledgements as well, including Akiko Higashimura, Digitarou and Yoshinao Dao.

References

External links
Knights of Sidonia at Kodansha 
 

2009 manga
2014 anime television series debuts
2015 anime television series debuts
2021 anime films
Anime series based on manga
Animeism
Anime postponed due to the COVID-19 pandemic
Biopunk anime and manga
Artificial intelligence in fiction
Brain–computer interfacing in fiction
Biorobotics in fiction
Films postponed due to the COVID-19 pandemic
Funimation
Genetic engineering in fiction
Japanese computer-animated television series
Japanese computer-animated films
Kodansha manga
Mecha anime and manga
Polygon Pictures
Seinen manga
Sentai Filmworks
Space opera anime and manga
Tsutomu Nihei
Vertical (publisher) titles
Winner of Kodansha Manga Award (General)